Alexander Mahoney (born 30 January 1947) was a New Zealand cricketer. He was a right-handed batsman and slow left-arm bowler who played for Berkshire. He was born in Invercargill.

Mahoney, whose career began with two Hawke Cup appearances for Southland in 1973/74, played for Berkshire in the Minor Counties Championship between 1975 and 1976. He picked up his County Cap in 1975.

Mahoney's sole List A appearance came in the 1976 Gillette Cup, against Hertfordshire. From the lower order, he scored a duck, but picked up figures of 4-32 from 12 overs with the ball, the best batting figures for the team.

External links
Alexander Mahoney at Cricket Archive 

1947 births
Living people
Berkshire cricketers
New Zealand cricketers